Storevar was a village in the municipality of Stokke, Norway, located by the Tønsberg Fjord. Its population (SSB 2005) was 367. Storevar was its own village until 2015, and became a part of neighboring Melsomvik village in 2016.

There are three islands outside Storevar: Gåsøykalven, Gåsøy, and Ravnø. During winters, the ocean occasionally freezes and makes it possible to hike to the islands from the village.

References

Villages in Vestfold og Telemark